Sadokrzyce  is a rich village in the administrative district of Gmina Wróblew, within Sieradz County, Łódź Voivodeship, in central Poland. This village arise in 1314.

References

Sadokrzyce